Sugee cake is a type of cake made of semolina and almonds, creamed butter, eggs, and brandy, and optionally covered in marzipan and royal icing. The cake is typically baked during festive occasions  and holidays like Christmas, by members of the Eurasian community in Singapore.

Etymology
The word sugee possibly has its origins in Hindustani word for 'semolina'. Sugee cake is similar to the Sri Lankan Love cake baked during Christmas by the Eurasian Burgher people, which uses cashew as opposed to almonds.

Shake Shack Singapore
In 2020, American restaurant chain Shake Shack adapted the flavor of the sugee cake in a limited edition milkshake, dubbed "sugee boogie", in its outlets in Singapore.

See also 
 Eurasians in Singapore
 Kristang people

References 

Eurasian cuisine of Singapore
Cakes